Denderleeuw is a municipality located in the Belgian province of East Flanders in the Denderstreek. In 2021, Denderleeuw had a total population of 20.730. The total area is 13.77 km².

The current mayor of Denderleeuw is Jo Fonck, from the LvB.

References

External links

Official website  

Municipalities of East Flanders